Sărata-Galbenă is a commune in Hîncești District, Moldova. It is composed of five villages: Brătianovca, Cărpineanca, Coroliovca, Sărata-Galbenă and Valea Florii.  Its existence was first documented in 1609.

FC Petrocub Hîncești is based in the commune.

References

Communes of Hîncești District